Garab-e Olya or Garrab-e Olya may refer to:

 Garrab-e Olya, Kermanshah
 Garab-e Olya, Khuzestan
 Garab-e Olya, Kohgiluyeh and Boyer-Ahmad
 Garab-e Olya, Lorestan
 Garab-e Olya, alternate name of Garab Kuchek, Lorestan Province